Suphisellus variicollis is a species of burrowing water beetle in the subfamily Noterinae. It was described by Zimmermann in 1921 and is found in Argentina, Bolivia and Brazil.

References

Suphisellus
Beetles described in 1921